Magic Johnson's Fast Break (alternatively titled Magic Johnson's Basketball) is a side-scrolling basketball sports game developed by Arcadia Systems and published in 1988. The game features the name and likeness of Los Angeles Lakers point guard Earvin "Magic" Johnson Jr., and was endorsed by PepsiCo.

In 1990 Tradewest published Software Creations' adaptation of the game for the Nintendo Entertainment System (NES). It was one of several celebrity-endorsed sports games published by Tradewest, and was promoted with a television advertisement campaign. An adaptation to the Apple IIGS was cancelled.

Gameplay
The game features two generic basketball teams.  Most versions of the game have one- and two-player modes. The NES version is one of a handful of NES software titles to support three- and four-player simultaneous play using either the NES Satellite or NES Four Score console accessories. The multiplayer modes allow competition in single games, but there is no tournament play.

See also
Double Dribble (1986)
Super Slam Dunk (1993)

External links

Magic Johnson's Basketball at Lemon Amiga

Magic Johnson's Basketball at Spectrum Computing

1988 video games
Amiga games
Amstrad CPC games
Arcade video games
Basketball video games
Commodore 64 games
DOS games
Fast Break
Mastertronic games
Nintendo Entertainment System games
Sports video games set in the United States
Tradewest games
ZX Spectrum games
Multiplayer and single-player video games
Video games scored by Alberto Jose González
Video games scored by Tim Follin
Video games developed in the United Kingdom
Video games based on real people
Cultural depictions of basketball players